Ådne Nissestad (born 18 November 1995) is a Norwegian football goalkeeper who plays for Fana.

References

1995 births
Living people
Footballers from Bergen
Norwegian footballers
Eliteserien players
SK Brann players
Fana IL players
Association football goalkeepers